Unknown is an anthology of fantasy fiction short stories edited by Stanley Schmidt, the fifth of a number of anthologies drawing their contents from the classic magazine Unknown of the 1930s-1940s. It was first published in paperback by Baen Books in October 1988.

The book collects nine tales by various authors, together with an introduction by the editor.

Contents
 "Introduction" (Stanley Schmidt)
 "The Compleat Werewolf" (Anthony Boucher (Unknown Worlds, Apr. 1942)
 "The Coppersmith" (Lester del Rey (Unknown, Sep. 1939)
 "A God in a Garden" (Theodore Sturgeon (Unknown, Oct. 1939)
 "Even the Angels" (Malcolm Jameson (Unknown Fantasy Fiction, Aug. 1941)
 "Smoke Ghost" (Fritz Leiber (Unknown Worlds, Oct. 1941)
 "Nothing in the Rules" (L. Sprague de Camp ((Unknown, Jul. 1939)
 "A Good Knight's Work" (Robert Bloch (Unknown Worlds, Oct. 1941)
 "The Devil We Know" (Henry Kuttner (Unknown Fantasy Fiction, Aug. 1941)
 "The Angelic Angleworm" (Fredric Brown (Unknown Worlds, Feb. 1943)

Notes

1988 books
Fantasy anthologies
Stanley Schmidt anthologies
Works originally published in Unknown (magazine)